The  New York Giants season was the franchise's 9th season in the National Football League.

Schedule

Regular season

Postseason

Game Summaries

Week 1: at Pittsburgh Pirates

Week 2: at Portsmouth Spartans

Week 3: at Green Bay Packers

Week 4: at Boston Redskins

Week 5: vs. Philadelphia Eagles

Week 6: vs. Brooklyn Dodgers

Week 7: at Chicago Bears

Week 8: vs. Portsmouth Spartans

Week 9: vs. Boston Redskins

Week 10: vs. Chicago Bears

Week 11: vs. Green Bay Packers

Week 12 (Game 1): at Brooklyn Dodgers

Week 12 (Game 2): vs. Pittsburgh Pirates

Week 13: at Philadelphia Eagles

1933 NFL Championship Game

Standings

See also
List of New York Giants seasons

New York Giants seasons
New York Giants
New York Giants
1930s in Manhattan
Washington Heights, Manhattan